Kunda Park is an industrial suburb of Buderim in the Sunshine Coast Region, Queensland, Australia.

Geography 
The northern boundary of Kunda Park follows Eudlo Creek, a tributary of the South Maroochy River. In the northwest Eudlo Creek Conservation Park preserves a large section of uncleared land along Eudlo Creek. There is a small area of grazing land near the conservation park. Apart from that, the suburb is industrial.

History
The area was formerly known locally as Crete. The township of Kunda Park was named by the Queensland Place Names Board on 1 May 1975. The name Kunda is believed to be the Kabi language word gunda or konda, meaning cabbage tree palm.

References

Suburbs of the Sunshine Coast Region
Buderim